is a fictional character in the anime series Code Geass: Lelouch of the Rebellion produced by Sunrise, Inc. In the original Japanese dubbing, he is voiced by Takahiro Sakurai and his younger self is voiced by Akeno Watanabe.

Character outline
Suzaku Kururugi, born on July 10, 2000 a.t.b., is the son of Japan's last prime minister, Genbu Kururugi. His existence was kept secret from the public until after the war. Suzaku met Lelouch vi Britannia and his sister Nunnally vi Britannia when they moved to the Kururugi residence as a diplomatic peace trade. At first, Suzaku initially thought Lelouch was a selfish prince and despised him. However, as time passed, he came to know Lelouch better, and they soon became best friends. They were separated when Britannia invaded Japan but was reunited in the Shinjuku Ghetto.

When Britannia began its invasion of Japan, Suzaku was mortified by the violence and his father's belief that resisting to the bitter end was preferable to surrender. Unable to change his father's mind, Suzaku murdered him during a heated exchange. The incident was covered up and Suzaku's life was spared, while the government was thrown into disarray and surrendered to Britannia. Lelouch believes that, had Genbu lived, Japan likely would have been torn apart by war once the other major powers decided to intervene. His guilt over the incident causes Suzaku to constantly place himself on the frontlines in the hope of atoning for his actions with his death. It also inspires his belief that the ends achieved with immoral means are meaningless since he created peace through murder. However, after firing the F.L.E.I.J.A. warhead, under the command of Lelouch's Geass, he abandons this belief and decides to achieve his goals regardless of the means. This causes him to finally join Lelouch.

Character history

First season
Suzaku is introduced in the first episode of the series as an Honorary Britannian soldier. While searching the Shinjuku ghetto for poison gas stolen by resistance members, he finds Lelouch standing next to it. He refuses to carry out an order to kill Lelouch, and is shot by his superior officer for his insubordination. However, the bullet is stopped by a broken pocket watch belonging to his deceased father.

While recovering from his injuries at the command center, Suzaku is approached by Lloyd Asplund and offered a chance to pilot the experimental Knightmare Frame Lancelot. The Lancelot's advanced systems combined with his unprecedented piloting skills allow him to almost single-handedly dismantle Lelouch's plan to rout the massacre of Shinjuku ghetto, but he finds himself under arrest afterward for the murder of Prince Clovis; though Lelouch was in fact responsible for this, the military used him as a scapegoat since they had no suspect, citing his Japanese heritage as motive in spite of his Honorary Britannian status.

Lelouch rescues Suzaku from his impending execution by assuming the identity of Zero and takes credit for Clovis' murder, forcing the military to acquit Suzaku, but Suzaku refuses to join his cause. He agrees that the Britannian Empire is corrupt and not worth serving, but wants to change and improve the Empire from within, to show that his father's death was not in vain.

Suzaku remains the pilot of the Lancelot.  He is reunited with Lelouch and Nunnally after enrolling into Ashford Academy at Euphemia's suggestion. He is promoted to Warrant Officer by Cornelia li Britannia when she first arrives in Japan, and is appointed Euphemia's personal Knight, gaining the rank of Major, after a televised battle with the Black Knights. This ruins Lelouch's plan to have Suzaku protect Nunnally when his role as Zero takes him away from Area 11. During the battle on Shikine Island, in which Suzaku is ordered to kill Zero, Lelouch is uses the power of Geass on Suzaku in order to escape destruction, and commands him to "live," forcing him to survive by any means from then on.

Suzaku falls in love with Euphemia, and is emotionally crushed by her death at Zero's hands. He is visited by V.V., who explains Zero's power of Geass, which drives him to find and kill Zero. He follows Lelouch to Kamine and confirms his identity, after trying to convince himself that Zero and Lelouch were not the same person. Lelouch offers Suzaku a truce in order to rescue Nunnally, but Suzaku insists that Lelouch's very existence should be ended. Lelouch draws his pistol and both men attempt to shoot one another, at which point the screen fades to black and the season ends with the sound of a single gunshot.

Akito The Exiled
Suzaku makes his debut in Episode 2 of the OVA, The Wyvern Divided. He was revealed along with C.C. during the preview of Episode 2. Suzaku is a Knight of Round in this OVA. He is seen accompanying  Julius Kingsley, arriving at St. Petersburg. This was ordered by the Emperor. In OVA 3, Suzaku's Lancelot's shield is adorned with a custom made Knight Of Honor emblem to honor Euphemia.

Julius and Suzaku were granted authority to take command of Euro Britannia thanks to the Imperial Scepter granted by the Emperor. Suzaku continues to show hostility towards Julius Kingsley. Later Julius launches his campaign "World Liberation Ark Fleet" as a ruse to causes chaos amongst the E.U. This causes a feud between the higher ups of E.U. regarding innocents and as a result, the Archduke of Verance was arrested thanks to Shin's support. While Julius and Shin were playing chess, Suzaku stood by until Julius started to breakdown. Shin later confirms that Julius is a terrorist Zero and that Suzaku is the greatest proof. Suzaku pointed a gun at him by refuting the fact and that Zero was executed by the Emperor but regardless Shin started to deduce what happened back in the attack of Japan before becoming Area 11 by comparing him when they both killed their parents. The Knights of St Michael attacked to protect Shin but were completely outmatched against the Lancelot. His ruthless and devastating defeat of the knights gained him the title "White Reaper". While Suzaku is fighting Jean, Shin asks Suzaku what it takes to change the world. After sparing both Jean and Julius, they were imprisoned in OVA 4 with the Lancelot imprisoned and during that time Lelouch begins talking to Suzaku by hallucinating his past memories.

In the final OVA, Lelouch asks Suzaku for some water. Suzaku gives him the water jug, then he tries to avenge Euphemia by choking him to death. Lelouch begs him to kill him as Suzaku sees a tear from his Geass eye, but then he releases him, seemingly horrified by his own actions. Afterwards, Suzaku lets Lelouch rest his head on his shoulder. Suzaku and Lelouch are later released by Rolo, who tells them that the emperor wishes an audience with Lelouch. Suzuku knowing that Lelouch will get his memory wiped looked on depressed.

Second season (R2)
In the second season, Suzaku receives a promotion into the Knights of the Round, the most powerful order of warriors in the Britannian Empire, as a reward for capturing Zero. He intends to become the Knight of One, which will allow him to rule Area 11 by his choosing. He still holds his desire to kill Zero. However, he seems to still have some faith in Lelouch, and looks forward for a chance to clear his doubts about his friend by asking him about the incident with Euphemia.

Suzaku and the other Knights of the Round watch as Zero announces that he will continue his plans to create the United States of Japan. Suzaku returns to Area 11 as a student in Ashford Academy to discover if Lelouch has regained his memories of being Zero. Unable to find any sort of sign, Suzaku lets Lelouch speak to the new Viceroy of Area 11, Nunnally, which also ends in failure thanks to Rolo Lamperouge using his Geass to freeze Suzaku temporarily. When Lelouch attempts to kidnap Nunnally as she is being brought to Area 11, Suzaku steps in to rescue her.

Zero later unexpectedly announces that he will accept Nunnally's offer in exchange for exile; this is revealed to be a clever ruse when Zero has all one million Elevens participating dress exactly like him, leaving Suzaku no choice but to exile the entire group to prevent another massacre.

Suzaku is deployed to the Chinese Federation's capital, where the First Prince of Britannia and the Empress Tianzi are to be wed; however, Zero kidnaps the Empress during the ceremony. Britannian aid is requested in recovering the Empress, and Suzaku personally has Kallen Stadtfeld transferred into Britannian custody before heading into the battle.

In the aftermath of Shirley's death, Suzaku investigates Shirley's supposed suicide and comes to the conclusion that Lelouch murdered her. He decides to question Kallen about Zero's true identity, threatening to use Refrain if she does not cooperate.  In the end, Suzaku does not use the Refrain, realizing that by doing so he would be no better than Lelouch. Frustrated, he goes to confront Lelouch personally and discovers that the Intelligence Agency is under the effect of Geass, confirming that Lelouch has regained his memories.

After the creation of the United Federation of Nations is cut short by the Emperor's appearance, Suzaku is contacted by a desperate Lelouch, who asks him to protect Nunnally from the Emperor. Suzaku agrees to his request, but only if Lelouch meets him alone at the Kururugi shrine. The meeting goes well at first and Suzaku decides to help him if Lelouch ends his war, but Schneizel's unexpected attempt to arrest Lelouch makes him believe Suzaku went back on his word. During the second battle of Tokyo, Suzaku is attacked by Guilford under the influence of Lelouch's Geass and Jeremiah Gottwald who Lelouch convinced to join the Black Knights. Though both are drawn away from Suzaku, he is forced to battle Kallen in her improved Guren. Driven to the edge, Suzaku realizes he cannot win and comes to terms with his death as an atonement. In doing so, Suzaku's Geass command activates and forces him to use the F.L.E.I.J.A. bomb. Kallen dodges and the bomb instead hits the government complex, wiping out the entire government building and most of the surrounding area.

Realizing that he has been naïve, Suzaku decides that the ends are more important than the means used to reach them and takes a more active approach to becoming Knight of One, offering to kill the Emperor for Schneizel. Schneizel agrees and Suzaku heads to Kamine Island to complete his mission, as well as kill the one responsible for the chain of events leading to Lelouch's actions and Euphemia's death. However, Suzaku is derailed by the Knight of One, Bismarck Waldstein, eventually submitting to his Geass and falling back. He later enters the Sword of Akasha with C.C. and agrees with Lelouch that the wishes of Charles and Marianne are selfish, even stopping Marianne from approaching Lelouch. One month later, he assists Lelouch in taking the throne, becoming his "Knight of Zero."

When the surviving Knights of the Round attempt to remove Lelouch from power, Suzaku easily defeats them with his new Lancelot Albion. He also assists in taking the U.F.N. leaders hostage. During the battle against Schneizel and the Black Knights, he joins Lelouch in boarding the Damocles, holding Gino off while Lelouch goes ahead. Suzaku comes out victorious, but Gino's last attack opens the shields and allows Kallen to take over. Kallen manages to land a fatal blow on the Lancelot while his last attack disables her Knightmare. The Lancelot explodes shortly after Kallen is rescued by Gino. Despite being nearly defeated in the duel itself, Suzaku is the one to attain the goal of the fight: to prevent Kallen from going after Lelouch, thus winning him the final victory and keeping the Zero Requiem on track.

Suzaku is believed to have died in the blast, but he reappears before the world as the new Zero to kill Lelouch, now the despised tyrannical Emperor of the world, as part of their plan for world peace. With the Zero Requiem complete, Suzaku weeps silently as he impales Lelouch and watches him die. Lelouch gives Suzaku his final order: As punishment for betraying his native homeland many years ago and for all else he has done, Lelouch tells Suzaku that he is dead from that day on and must continue to exist as Zero, relinquishing his identity and the right to happiness for the sake of the world so long as he lives; an order Suzaku accepts. Afterwards Suzaku becomes Nunnally's protector in the following months, aided by Schneizel, who is still under a Geass command to obey Zero.

Lelouch of the Resurrection
In the events of the 2019 film Code Geass: Lelouch of the Re;surrection, which takes place a year after the events of the alternate universe trilogy movies, Suzaku is escorting Nunnally when they are captured by the Zilkhistans. Suzaku was imprisoned before being freed and reunited with Lelouch, who was resurrected from the dead by C.C. and who briefly resumes his cover as Zero long enough to save his sister and bequeaths the title back to Suzaku.

Abilities
While Suzaku possesses no outwardly superhuman powers, such as Geass, his physical prowess is top-notch. He possesses superior hand-eye coordination and has extensive military training in both firearms and hand-to-hand combat. He is also strong enough to lift both Lelouch and Shirley on his own with one arm. Before Britannia's invasion of Japan, Suzaku was trained by his instructor, Kyoshiro Tohdoh, in martial arts, and has spent most of his time training to become stronger. He is also skilled in the art of kendo. His trademark is a spinning kick first used on Lelouch in the first episode, which he is able to replicate in his Knightmare. His sensorial perception is likewise above normal: he is able to detect Kallen trying to sneak up on him twice and stops a dagger in mid-air without even turning to face it.

Suzaku's physical prowess has been shown to be almost superhuman. In episode 16, he manages to destroy a ceiling-mounted remote machine gun while unarmed by running up a wall and kicking it (the gun's motion tracker was said to have a lag time of 0.05 seconds). He has also dodged machine-gun fire from Knightmares on multiple occasions. In the light novels, he is depicted at ten years of age as being able to defeat several adult men with a wooden training sword used in kendo.

Suzaku is an extremely skilled pilot, rated at 94% operational efficiency by Lloyd based on his performance at the Shinjuku ghetto. Cécile also notes that his simulator scores were the highest of his class. His lack of any tactics confuses Lelouch, as he fights with reflex instead of strategy. The Lancelot's superior abilities also help, as few other Knightmare Frames can match its astonishing speed or overcome its considerable defenses. Even when Lelouch manages to predict his movements, Suzaku's reflexes allowed him to narrowly escape what would have otherwise been certain death.

Despite not possessing a Geass power, Suzaku has the peculiar ability to detect C.C. and others who grant the power of Geass. C.C. speculates that this is either due to her having previously used her abilities on him, or another unidentified factor. Following episode 18 in the first season, Suzaku is also placed under a command by Lelouch to "live." As this command gives no time or event limitations, it activates every time Suzaku feels suicidal (or otherwise accepts his death as an inevitability) and forces him to survive by any means. It also activates to a lesser extent when his life is in immediate danger. He is the only character other than Mao whom Lelouch has placed a permanent Geass ever to become aware of it, having been told so by V.V.. Suzaku eventually learns to intentionally trigger his Geass command to help unleash his full potential during combat. He used this ability to defeat Bismarck Waldstein and to deploy a countermeasure to the F.L.E.I.J.A. warhead in tandem with Lelouch, which contained a program that had to be executed within 0.04 seconds of detonation to have an effect.

Appearances in other media

Lost Colors
In the video game spin-off Code Geass: Lost Colors, if the player uses Rai's geass on Suzaku to make him join the Black Knights, Suzaku joins and brutally fights off the Britannian forces. He also participates in the Black Rebellion, which has the Black Knights winning the war. However, in forcing Suzaku to join, the player angers Lelouch, who wanted to recruit Suzaku without using Geass. Lelouch puts Rai into an eternal sleep, resulting in a game over.
 	
The player may choose to pursue Suzaku as a friend by joining the Britannian military. In the All Hail Britannia route, Rai becomes Suzaku's partner in battle and receives a Knightmare Frame of his own similar to the Lancelot. He may use his own Geass to stop Euphemia from ordering the infamous massacre portrayed in episode 22-23 under Lelouch's accidental Geass. After ordering the Princess to stop and then ordering the crowd to forget her order, Euphemia's plan to create the Special Zone of Japan succeeds. Rai and Suzaku are then known as the new country's two White Knights.

In the Black Knights path, if Rai stops Princess Euphemia from following through with Lelouch's accidental Geass (an alternate version to episode 22-23), Suzaku (who is standing nearby) will catch the princess as she suddenly collapses. She wakes up in his arms without any recollection of being under the control of Lelouch's Geass.

Nightmare of Nunnally
In the manga spin-off series, Suzaku's appearance is changed slightly. Some parts of his hair are down, and his eye color is blue instead of green. Both his knight outfit and his pilot outfit are also customized with a blue samurai arm gauntlet. Suzaku also owns his own Ōkatana with a custom Britannian hilt.

Suzaku first appeared in chapter 7 of the manga series, and has received approval from Schneizel for Euphemia to have Suzaku as her knight. In the manga, Suzaku is shown to have an ability to sense the power of other people with Geass. When Suzaku first fought against Lelouch as Zero in his Lancelot Knightmare Frame, Lelouch noticed that his powers are negated, hinting that Suzaku might have another ability. This is further hinted in chapter 14, when he meets Alice; she notes it is impossible for anyone to sneak up on her, and when she shakes his hand, she notes later that she felt a chill. However, Suzaku doesn't appear to be aware of this, or indeed of Alice's abilities.  In Chapter 13, it is revealed that in this timeline, Suzaku did not kill his father; C.C. did in order to protect Lelouch and Nunnally. Later, Suzaku is revealed to be a being known as a 'Wired' a being who can access the power of Eden Vital without entering into a Geass Contract and thus having the qualifications to become a 'Demon King' like Zero, but was shocked when the identity of Zero was revealed to be Lelouch.

After the Mark Nemo pilot was captured, Suzaku was approached by Lelouch, who was shocked when he revealed the pilot was Nunnally and had no choice but to help him, and later passed the information to Euphemia. Suzaku, along with Lelouch as Zero, arrived on time to stop Nunnally from being executed by her other brother, Rolo Vi Britannia, on Euphemia's orders and proceeds to fight Rolo and his knight, Anya Alstreim, only to be defeated by Anya's Tristan Knightmare Frame. After Alice flees with Nunnally and Emperor Charles zi Britannia declares the Holy Nation of Eden Vital, Suzaku is arrested along with Euphemia, Cornelia as well as his comrades Guilford, Lloyd and Cecile. He is rescued by Zero and, despite his mistrust, helps him make Euphemia the Empress of Britannia.  Having lost his original Lancelot, Suzaku deploys the Lancelot Albion with Zero in his Gawain against the Emperor's Knights of Rounds (who are revealed to be undead zombies).  Suzaku and his Albion are almost defeated, but are saved by Charles' defeat. At the end of the series, Suzaku remains as Euphemia's knight and the two of them meet Lelouch for the last time when he appeared to them in Euphemia's office to bid farewell.

Suzaku of the Counterattack
In the manga spin-off series shows, Suzaku as the main protagonist, wearing a bionic combat suit and going by the alias Lancelot. Suzaku also develops a close friendship with Lloyd's assistant Mariel Lubie, and later meets her father, Lenard Lubie, who requested Suzaku to take care of her.

After a renegade Black Knights faction had attacked the Lubie automobile, which killed Lenard and injured Mariel when the wrecked car was destroyed, Suzaku is fueled in anger as he seeks to defeat Zero. Fulfilling Lenard's request, Suzaku is taking care of Mariel until she gets better.

It is revealed that he had killed his father Genbu, but it was done when Suzaku found out that he and the Emperor of Japan were willing to collaborate with Britannia and kill off anti-occupation Japanese officials and civilians. In a fit of anger, he stabs Genbu in the chest.

When Suzaku meets Schneizel, he is moved by his words that he wished to create a world were everyone is equal, and offers Suzaku a position as his knight. Suzaku accepts, believing that Schneizel can end the fighting.

When an art gallery, with the Emperor Charles, was in control by the Black Knight, Suzaku was sent by Schneizel to try and prevent any civilian from getting hurt and was surprised to find that Kallen was a member and revealed that she is half Britannian-Japanese, but left her when he realized that Zero is after the Emperor. When he arrived he saw not only the Emperor dead but saw Schneizel being shot by Zero, causing him to shoot shot his gun at his mask, which cracked and was shocked to see that it was Lelouch as Zero. When he demand why he did it, Lelouch replied that he only did it for the both of them. Suzaku find it hard to believe as the two point the gun at each other and fired, with Lelouch missed the shot and Suzaku shot away Lelouch's gun, but later one of the Glaston Knights shot at Lelouch and leaving him injured. Schneizel praises Suzaku for his efforts, but mentions the event that happened seven years ago, which he shouldn't have known about. Suzaku is torn over the decision to execute Lelouch, since it will take Nunnally's brother from her.

Later Suzaku discovers C.C., who reveals that it was Schneizel, not Lelouch, who killed the Emperor. He plans to take C.C.'s immortality. Realizing that he's been serving the wrong man, Suzaku frees Lelouch to help confront Schneizel. Suzaku and Lelouch infiltrate the Government building and confront Schneizel, who has already absorbed some of C.C.'s powers, allowing him to easily dispatch them. With Schneizel about to fully gain C.C.'s powers and her immortality, Suzaku reveals himself as a Regulator, negating Schneizel's ability and then kills him with his sword. With Schneizel now dead, C.C.'s powers are instead transferred to Suzaku, now possessing all of her abilities and her immortality. With Suzaku and Lelouch preparing to leave with C.C., Jeremiah arrived and shot Lelouch before the floor collapsed and he fell to his death. Suzaku managed to save Lelouch and escape with C.C. before the entire Government building collapsed, with the fate of Lloyd surviving is unknown.

Five years later with the Black Knights supposed victory, an immortal Suzaku went past a 22-year-old Kallen, still a member of the Black Knights, and arrived at a house, where Lelouch and Nunnally were then living, and happily greeted a surprised Lelouch, now 22 and his right eye covered with his hair.

Code Geass (manga)
Suzaku is present in the manga adaptation with many differences. He was already a student at Ashford Academy from the start. He was not present with Lelouch when C.C. was revealed to be in the capsule. Finally, he met Euphemia while at the Academy and not on the streets. He still believes that he can change the system from within.

The Miraculous Birthday
In a special Code Geass Picture Drama episode, Suzaku arrived at Ashford Academy with Nunnally, Shirley, and Nina, and had met with Lelouch, but also brought C.C. with him and commented if she's Lelouch's girlfriend, to which she replied that he proposed to her, and suggested a wedding being held at the Kururugi Shrine for them. However, a battle erupted in school grounds by the Neo-Chinese Federation and took everyone hostage.

While everyone escape to the student council room, Lelouch thought of a plan to defeat the enemy, but requires assistance from the others, to which Suzaku agreed with the plan and went with Kallen. After defeating all of the Chinese soldiers in the school's east hall, the two reflect on each other's performance, with Kallen talking about Suzaku's spinkick move that he also used on the Lancelot, to which Suzaku revealed the name of his spinkick move to her as "Hinoboru-ryu Makoto-ichi-Shiki Hurricane Kick", to which he commented from his former Master, Kyoshiro Tohdoh, that most kids find it hard to say and named it "Suzaku Kururugi spinkick" instead, to which Suzaku has taken a shine to it. The two arrived at the school's chapel, acting as the Neo-Chinese's HQ, and confronted the leader, but was tricked and their souls were absorbed into mystic item known as the "Thousand-man Silver Vase". However, Suzaku manage to return to his body with Kallen, with help from Lelouch who used his Zero persona, and used his spinkick on the eunuchs.

In the aftermath, Suzaku watches Lelouch's body disappearing and was thanked by him before giving him an inspirational speech. When the group realized Rolo, Shirley, and C.C. were gone, Suzaku realized the date being December 5 being Lelouch's birthday. Suzaku once again donned his Zero persona and commented that he still will not say thanks to Lelouch because of everything that has happened, but still says Happy Birthday to him in respect.

Another Century's Episode: R
The fourth installment of the Another Century's Episode series, Another Century's Episode R will feature Suzaku with his Lancelot. The setting in his world will be an alternative version of the event of R2. A brief plot was revealed in the second promotional video in the official website and a short detail of the event set in the A.C.E. R main planet, Eria.

Set in an alternative event of the second season of episode 06, Suzaku arrived with Gino and Anya when a Britannian ship was attacked by the Black Knights and were confronted by Kallen, and was overpowered by her. While Suzaku wishes to continue, Gino however convinced him to return to the Chinese Federation to regroup.

After the eunuchs defeat in the Chinese Federation, Suzaku arrive with the three Rounds member, Gino, Anya, and Luciano, and a fleet of Britannian Knightmare Frames led by Schneizel. As they are about to fight the Black Knights an unknown black energy appeared and was suddenly transported to Eria, where he was separated with the other Britannian forces and the other Rounds, but manage to board the Avalon with Lloyed and Ceclie, who were also sucked in. In Eria, Suzaku and co have appeared on a mountain landscape, were Cecil discovered Zero near their area. After finding Zero, he encountered different mechs who are with him. Kei and Olson D. Verne from Super Dimension Century Orguss, and Kei ask whether he would join them, which Suzaku refuse because of their alliance with Zero and prepares to attack, but was interrupted by one of the Seasons, Spring One, in her Core unit, Sea Plant, with a group of Icon units. When Spring offered them allegiance, Suzaku hesitated because he will not forgive Zero, but will not trust anyone that would protect Zero, and he refuses. After Spring ordered the attack, Suzaku ordered the Avalon to assist Zero and his new allies. After her defeat and the appearance of more Icons, he and the others witness Macross Quarter from the Macross Zero series, with the Ark Alpha, and witness it destroying a fleet of Icon. As the Macross Quarter captain, Jeffrey Wilder, offered the group to join up with them, Zero agreed and asked Suzaku to come with them, which he hesitated but accepts.

Later in their first mission together with Zero and the others, Suzaku and the others fought against Spring One in her Core unit, Sea Stand, which Autumn later delivered the final blow in her Core unit, Alpharto, causing Spring to escape. When Zero question if she is really human, Suzaku was surprised when Autumn revealed she isn't but an android.

Suzaku, along with Alto Saotome and other mechs from the Macross Frontier, followed Brera Sterne, who had also sided with Seasons along with Grace O'Conner, to a ruined city, where he was shocked that Gino and Anya, along with some Britannian forces had sided with the Season. and tried to convince them to stop, which Gino replied if he enjoyed being a Black Knight and tells him to come to their side, leaving Suzaku in doubt. However, Zero manage to convince him that the battle is not about Britannia or Japan but their worlds, leading Suzaku to reject Gino's offer and fight alongside Zero and defeating both Gino and Anya.

As the plot progresses, The group later encountered a group of Gareth Knightmare Frames, along with the Knight of Ten, Luciano Bradley, and surprisingly Li Xingke, who have sided with Seasons. With Xingke beginning the assault, Suzaku, along with Zero, C.C. and Kallen, have fought and defeated him, but when Xingke was about to be killed by Bradley, Suzaku had blocked his attack and saved him, leading Xingke to switch sides and defeating Luciano, leading him to his death.

Suzaku and Co then confronts the other four Season's in their Core units and later Dr. Shiki, in Winter's body, piloting the ACE Core. After his defeat and Autumn using all of her powers to prevent the hole to expand, Suzaku returns to his own world along with Zero, Kallen, and others. Suzaku was then requested by Zero that the two discuss, and later went their separate ways, knowing they'll be enemies again.

Another Century's Episode: Portable
Suzaku appears in the sequel with his Lancelot Albion.

Super Robot Wars Z 2 Hakai-Hen
Suzaku and the rest of the Code Geass R1 cast will make their debut to the Super Robot Wars franchise in this game, using their R1 Knightmares.

Nunnally in Wonderland
In a special OVA parody episode, based on the Alice in Wonderland story, Suzaku appears in the role as the White Knight.

Reception

In the 29th Anime Grand Prix, Suzaku was sixth place with 143 votes, then 19th and 13th, respectively, in the following two. In the 2007 Seiyu Awards, Takahiro Sakurai was a nominee in the category "Best Actors in supporting roles" for his portrayal as Suzaku, but lost to Akira Ishida and Kouki Miyata.

Critical reception to Suzaku has been mainly positive. Anime News Network's Bamboo Dong regarded Suzaku as a likable character, contrasting his role and personality with Lelouch's. Kevin Leathers from UK Anime Network agreed with Dong, as Suzaku "counter-balance[s]" Lelouch's alterego due to how he does not wish violence. Moreover, IGN's D.F. Smith described Suzaku as Lelouch's "opposite number", and also gave praise to the friendship the two share. While reviewing an episode from the series, Ramsey Isler found comical and disappointing how was Suzaku forced to stay at school for extra hours having just finished a highly dangerous mission. His confrontation against Lelouch in the first season's finale was praised mainly because of Suzaku's mentality and his feelings regarding Zero's identity which he confesses he denied accepting such revelation. Kotaku found Suzaku as an interesting lead due to his irony of working for Britannia in order to change the Empire once taking over. While this causes to see himself as "monster" due to working for them, he maintains a good duality with Lelouch's methods which are seen similar too. As the series' second half goes across, Kotaku noted that Suzaku finds himself more tormented by his actions, mostly when he nukes Tokyo using military weapons forced by Lelouch's powers to survive to a fight. As a result, the site felt Suzaku sees himself as "irredeemable". His final actions in the series' finale were also the subject of praise due to how Suzaku and Lelouch decide to become "evil" in order to end the chaos and create a greater good.

DVDTalk.com praised the handling of the first season's finale in regards to Suzaku's relationship with Lelouch who while, about to become allies, the a plot twist involving Euphemia causes a large impact in their roles in the story which might appeal to the audience. THEM Anime Reviews stated that their relationship is one of the most entertaining part of the movie as a result of how they are childhood friends yet across the story, they become enemies. The Fandom Post noted that Suzaku and Lelouch's relationship might attract female viewers so he recommended an anthology manga to them, praising the multiple designs presented.

The Fandom Post enjoyed how in Code Geass: Lelouch of the Re;surrection, Suzaku is still Lelouch's best friend. Meanwhile, Anime News Network noted that the film explored Lelouch's consequences in regards to the series' finale with Suzaku and C.C. being the only ones who took his side. On the other hand, Kotaku criticized Suzaku and Lelouch's role in the OVAs Akito the Exiled due to their lack of relevance while making the former angst for having the job of bodyguarding Lelouch during the time he hated him following the events of the first season.

References

External links
 Suzaku Kururugi  at GoThumb

Martial artist characters in anime and manga
Code Geass characters
Fictional assassins
Fictional aviators
Television characters introduced in 2006
Fictional characters with post-traumatic stress disorder
Fictional child soldiers
Fictional Japanese people in anime and manga
Fictional knights
Fictional majors
Fictional mass murderers
Fictional patricides
Fictional privates
Fictional regicides
Fictional special forces personnel
Fictional swordfighters in anime and manga
Male characters in anime and manga
Orphan characters in anime and manga
Teenage characters in anime and manga
Fictional high school students